Jarno Kultanen (born January 8, 1973) is a Finnish former professional ice hockey player who played between 1994 and 2010. He played in the SM-liiga for KalPa and HIFK, and in the National Hockey League for Boston Bruins. In Sweden played for Södertälje SK and Mora IK. After retiring from play he worked as a coach and later manager for KooKoo.

Career statistics

External links 
 

1973 births
Living people
Boston Bruins draft picks
Boston Bruins players
Espoo Blues players
Finnish ice hockey defencemen
HIFK (ice hockey) players
KalPa players
KooKoo players
Mora IK players
People from Luumäki
Providence Bruins players
Södertälje SK players
Sportspeople from South Karelia